Bachke Rehna Re Baba is a 2005 Bollywood adult comedy film directed by Govind Menon, starring Rekha, Paresh Rawal, Mallika Sherawat and Satish Shah.

Plot
Rukmini is well into her 40s and still unmarried. She lives with her orphaned niece, Padmini, and together they devise a scheme to entrap wealthy men, like Monty, relieve them of their money, abandon them, and move on to better targets. They do succeed for quite a while, assuming various disguises, and names, amassing a fortune, until Padmini falls in love with one of her targets, a young man named Raghu, and decides to call it quits. An unstable Rukmini, who owes money to Monty, decides she cannot go it alone and concocts a scheme that will force Padmini to give up on Raghu and re-join forces with her to go on plundering unsuspecting wealthy men.

Cast

Rekha - Rukmini/ Alka / Gulpreet 
Paresh Rawal - Monty Bagga
Mallika Sherawat - Padmini a.k.a. Paddu/Meera
Satish Shah - Mulchand/ Fakirchand Mansukhani
Karan Khanna - Raghu
Kurush Deboo - Wealthy doctor
Suresh Menon
Geeta Khanna as Shashikala
Arun Ranjankar
Manish Kumar
Umesh Shukla

Music
The music album of the film is composed by Anu Malik with lyrics written by Sayeed Quadri, Farhad Wadia, Anu Malik, Dev Kohli. Album has 8 Songs included remixes.

References

External links

2000s Hindi-language films
2005 comedy films
2005 films
Films scored by Anu Malik
Films scored by Surinder Sodhi
Hindi-language comedy films
Indian comedy films